Federico Matías Scoppa (born 7 July 1987) is an Argentine footballer who plays as a midfielder. He also holds Italian citizenship.

Club career
He made his Segunda Liga debut for Sporting Covilhã on 26 October 2008 in a game against Freamunde.

References

External links
 
 

1987 births
Footballers from Buenos Aires
Argentine people of Italian descent
Citizens of Italy through descent
Living people
Argentine footballers
Argentine expatriate footballers
Boca Juniors footballers
S.C. Covilhã players
L.D.U. Loja footballers
FC Inter Turku players
Defensores de Belgrano footballers
San Marcos de Arica footballers
Club y Biblioteca Ramón Santamarina footballers
Atlético de Rafaela footballers
Catania S.S.D. players
S.S. Monopoli 1966 players
L.R. Vicenza players
Cavese 1919 players
Liga Portugal 2 players
Veikkausliiga players
Primera B Metropolitana players
Chilean Primera División players
Primera Nacional players
Argentine Primera División players
Serie C players
Serie B players
Expatriate footballers in Portugal
Expatriate footballers in Ecuador
Expatriate footballers in Finland
Expatriate footballers in Chile
Expatriate footballers in Italy
Association football midfielders